Edaina Jaragocchu is a 2019 Indian Telugu language action thriller film directed by K Ramakanth and starring Vijay Raja, Pooja Solanki, Bobby Simha, and Sasha Singh in the lead roles. This film marks the debut of Sivaji Raja's son, Vijay Raja. The director Ramakanth previously worked as an assistant to Chandra Sekhar Yeleti. The film was launched on 11 July 2018, and the launch was attended by several celebrities.

Plot
Kalicharan is a local racketeer, who organises a cricket betting club as a bookie. His orphaned background made him insensitive and ruthless. He tortures and humiliates whoever tries to evade paying their debts. He maintains a private life and has a secret and kills everyone who discovers it.

Three friends - Jai, Vicky, and Rocky - who emerged from their birth date, April 1, always fall in trouble with their stupid actions, yet they consider themselves smart. They cannot tolerate if anybody calls or makes them fools. On his new job as bank recovery agent to collect the debts, Jai meets a beautiful girl, Sasi, and immediately falls for her. Sasi is educated and ambitious. It is her dream to become an entrepreneur like Chanda Kochhar and Indra Nooyi. She sets up a start-up company but loses all her money. In the process of creating a new start-up, she manages her lifestyle privately. In pursuance, Jay and Sasi formulate tit-for-tat plans and finally become friends. The three friends offer her a quick-money opportunity with bitcoins, but they lose the money.

To earn back her love and money, the boys go for cricket betting, which Kali organizes. Initially they win, but eventually they start losing all the bets and are in 1 crore debt to Kali. The boys are worried and do not know how to repay it. Soon, they realize that they were fooled by Kali and decide to take revenge by robbing him. When they enter Kalicharan’s mahal, they see a ghost who is Kali’s lifeline. The boys realize that Kali is practically living with the ghost. They are frightened and flee from the Mahal. Kali and the ghost pursue the boys. Kali and the ghost's identities are later revealed.

Cast 
Bobby Simha as Kalicharan
Vijay Raja as Jai 
Ravi Siva Teja as Vicky
Viva Raghav as Rocky
Pooja Solanki as Sasi
Sasha Singh as Baby
Nagendra Babu as Church Father 
Ajay Ghosh as Hizrath
Thagubothu Ramesh as Drunkard
Satya Krishnan
Harsha Chemudu
Chammak Chandra
Vennela Kishore as a movie director who looks for a real ghost for his film (special appearance)

Soundtrack
The soundtrack was composed by Srikanth Pendyala.
Kavale - Aparna Nandan
Anubavinchu - Prudhvi Chandran, Sweekar Agasthi
Adigo - Gold Devaraj, Lipsika
Cheliya - Yazin Nizar

Release 
A critic from 123Telugu wrote that "On the whole, Edaina Jaragochu is a horror crime-comedy which impresses in parts. Passable first half and good performances from Bobby Simha and Sashi Singh will keep the proceedings engaging. But on the flip side, the slow-paced lengthy second half makes it a below-average fare at the box office". But on OTT platforms, the audience critically well received.

References

https://telugu.asianetnews.com/movie-reviews/edaina-jaragochu-telugu-movie-review-pwoyc5

External links
 

2019 films
2010s Telugu-language films
Indian action thriller films
2019 action thriller films